Playing Fox was a chief of the Fox Native American tribe. His portrait was painted when he visited Washington.

References
Lafarge, Oliver. (MCMLVI). A Pictorial History of the American Indian, Crown Publishers Inc. (page 87)

Native American leaders